Francis Joseph "Red" Kane (January 19, 1923 — March 29, 2016) was a Canadian professional ice hockey player who played two games in the National Hockey League for the Detroit Red Wings during the 1943–44 season. The rest of his career, which lasted from 1943 to 1951, was spent in various minor leagues. He was born in Stratford, Ontario.

Career statistics

Regular season and playoffs

References

External links
 

1923 births
2016 deaths
Brantford Lions players
Canadian ice hockey defencemen
Detroit Red Wings players
Fort Worth Rangers players
Ice hockey people from Ontario
Indianapolis Capitals players
Los Angeles Monarchs players
New Haven Eagles players
St. Louis Flyers players
Sportspeople from Stratford, Ontario
Springfield Indians players
Tulsa Oilers (USHL) players
Vancouver Canucks (WHL) players